Patrick G. Young Jr. (born April 20, 1983) is an American politician from Maryland who is currently a member of the Baltimore County Council, representing District 1. He was previously a member of the Maryland House of Delegates in District 44B from 2015 to 2022, and served as the Chair of the Baltimore County Delegation from 2018 to 2022.

Early life and career 
Young was born in Catonsville, Maryland and graduated from Mount Saint Joseph High School in 2001. He was a member of the Boy Scouts of America Troop 140 in Woodlawn where he earned the rank of Eagle Scout in 2001.

After graduation, Young enlisted in the U.S. Marine Corps Infantry (1st Battalion, 8th Marine Regiment) and served through two combat tours in Iraq as well as a humanitarian mission to Liberia. In November 2004, he was awarded a combat promotion for actions rendered during the Second Battle of Fallujah.

After returning home, Young attended Towson University, where he founded the Student Veterans Group of Towson and earned three bachelor's degrees (political science, religious studies, and philosophy). In 2010, he was hired by Towson as the coordinator of veterans services. In 2011, Young was appointed by Governor Martin O'Malley to the Maryland Veterans Commission.

In May 2013, Young announced he would run for the Maryland House of Delegates in District 44B, seeking to succeed state Delegate Shirley Nathan-Pulliam, who announced a run for Maryland Senate in 2014. He won the Democratic primary with 22.9 percent of the vote, edging out his opponent by 34 votes and coming in second place behind incumbent state Delegate Charles E. Sydnor III. Young and Sydnor defeated Republican Michael Russell in the general election.

In the legislature 

Young was sworn into the Maryland House of Delegates on January 14, 2015. From December 2018 to 2022, he served as the chair of the Baltimore County Delegation.

In May 2021, Young announced that he would not seek re-election to the House of Delegates in 2022, instead opting to run for the Baltimore County Council, seeking the seat held by outgoing councilmember Tom Quirk. In March 2022, he was endorsed by county executive Johnny Olszewski. Young won the Democratic primary with 43.8 percent of the vote, and later won the general election on November 8, 2022, with 63.4 percent of the vote over his opponent.

Committee assignments
 Member, Appropriations Committee, 2015–2022 (health & human resources subcommittee, 2015–2017; oversight committee on pensions, 2015–2018; health & social services subcommittee, 2017–2022; chair, oversight committee on personnel, 2019–2022, vice-chair, 2019; member, capital budget subcommittee, 2020–2022)
 Regional Revitalization Work Group, 2015–2022
 Special Joint Committee on Pensions, 2016–2022
 Joint Committee on Legislative Information Technology and Open Government, 2017–2022
 House Chair, Joint Committee on the Management of Public Funds, 2019–2022
 Joint Committee on Cybersecurity, Information Technology, and Biotechnology, 2021–2022

Other memberships
 Chair, Baltimore County Delegation, 2018–2022
 Member, Maryland Legislative Transit Caucus, 2019–2022
 House Chair, Maryland Veterans Caucus, 2022 (vice-chair, 2016–2021)

Political positions
As a candidate, Young said he supported using eminent domain to take ownership of vacant properties.

During the 2015 legislative session, Young introduced a bill that would provide dependents of military veterans access to in-state tuition rates at Maryland colleges and universities.

In November 2019, Young endorsed South Bend mayor Pete Buttigieg for president. In January 2020, Young filed to run for delegate to the Democratic National Convention, authorized by Buttigieg.

In August 2020, Young joined a demonstration in front of the home of U.S. postmaster general Louis DeJoy, which was organized amid allegations that DeJoy was limiting mail-in voting ahead of the 2020 United States presidential election. In December 2020, Young joined ShutDown DC organizers in defending Black Lives Matter Plaza from the Proud Boys, a neo-fascist and white supremacist organization that tried to make their way past police lines and into the plaza throughout the day.

During the 2021 legislative session, Young introduced a bill that would establish an Office on Climate Change within the governor's office, which would be tasked with implementing the recommendations of the Maryland Commission on Climate Change.

During the 2022 legislative session and following a cyberattack against the Maryland Department of Health, Young introduced legislation that would offer increased protections to state and local government online networks. All three bills passed and were signed into law by Governor Larry Hogan on May 12, 2022.

Electoral history

References

External links 

1983 births
21st-century American politicians
Living people
United States Marine Corps personnel of the Iraq War
Democratic Party members of the Maryland House of Delegates
People from Catonsville, Maryland
Towson University alumni
United States Marines
County commissioners in Maryland
Towson University faculty